Amy Hobby is an American film producer. She is best known for producing documentary What Happened, Miss Simone? that earned her Academy Award for Best Documentary Feature nomination at 88th Academy Awards and Grammy Award for Best Music Film at 58th Annual Grammy Awards.

Filmography
 Paint It Black
 Coney Island Baby
 Love, Marilyn 
 SPAA Fringe  
 Secretary  
 And Everything Is Going Fine 
 Hamlet
 The Next Big Thing 
 Lucky Them 
 The Virginity Hit 
 The Unexplained

References

External links 
 

Year of birth missing (living people)
Living people
Rice University alumni
American documentary film producers
American film producers
American women documentary filmmakers
21st-century American women